Hugh Cruttwell (31 October 1918 – 24 August 2002) was an influential English teacher of drama and principal of the Royal Academy of Dramatic Art.

Biography
Hugh Percival Cruttwell was born in Singapore, but lived in England from the age of eight. He was educated at King's School, Bruton, in Somerset, and studied history at Hertford College, Oxford. He began his career as an assistant stage manager at the Theatre Royal, Windsor. He soon became an associate director and over a period of three years directed sixty plays. While working at Theatre Royal, he first met his future wife, actress Geraldine McKeown (who later took the stage name Geraldine McEwan). The couple married in 1953, and had two children: daughter Claudia and son Greg, an actor, screenwriter, director and film producer.

After leaving Windsor, Cruttwell enjoyed much success as a freelance director. Following a spell teaching at the London Academy of Music and Dramatic Art, he was approached to take over the principalship of the Royal Academy of Dramatic Art, following the resignation of John Fernald in 1965. He was heavily involved in the activities of Renaissance Theatre Company and Renaissance Films; companies established by David Parfitt and Kenneth Branagh. He was a production/creative consultant of Branagh's films of Henry V, Much Ado About Nothing, Dead Again, Peter's Friends and Mary Shelley's Frankenstein. He adapted, from a short story by Chekhov, the Academy Award-winning short film Swan Song, starring Sir John Gielgud.

Influence
In his eighteen years as principal of the Royal Academy of Dramatic Art, Cruttwell spotted, nurtured and polished generations of actors who have gone on to become household names. In paying homage to his former teacher and associate, Kenneth Branagh wrote:

Filmography
 Henry V (1989) .... Technical Advisor
 Dead Again (1991) .... Production Consultant
 Peter's Friends (1992) .... Production Consultant
 Swan Song (1992) .... Screenwriter
 Much Ado About Nothing (1993) .... Production Consultant
 Mary Shelley's Frankenstein (1994) .... Performance Consultant
 As Dreams Are Made On (2004) .... Special Thanks

References

External links
 Profile
 

1918 births
2002 deaths
English theatre directors
Academics of RADA
People educated at King's School, Bruton
People from Singapore
Alumni of Hertford College, Oxford
British people in British Malaya